The Cahuilla are a Native American people of Southern California.

Cahuilla may also refer to:
Cahuilla, California, an unincorporated community in Riverside County, California
Cahuilla Band of Mission Indians of the Cahuilla Reservation
Cahuilla County, California, a proposed county in Southern California
Cahuilla language, the language of the Cahuilla people
, a US Navy ship

See also
 Coahuila, a state of Mexico
 Kaweah (disambiguation)
 Lake Cahuilla